Bakhlayta is a rural locality (an ulus) in Kizhinginsky District, Republic of Buryatia, Russia. The population was 85 as of 2010. There are 4 streets.

Geography 
Bakhlayta is located 12 km southeast of Kizhinga (the district's administrative centre) by road. Sulkhara is the nearest rural locality.

References 

Rural localities in Kizhinginsky District